Edwin Walkley (10 May 1876 – 18 April 1950) was an Australian cricketer. He played in four first-class matches for South Australia between 1900 and 1902.

See also
 List of South Australian representative cricketers

References

External links
 

1876 births
1950 deaths
Australian cricketers
South Australia cricketers
Cricketers from Adelaide